St. Peters is a city in St. Charles County, Missouri, United States. The 2010 census showed the city's population to be 52,575, tied for 10th place in Missouri with Blue Springs.

Interstate 70 passes through the city, providing a major transportation link. In 2008, St. Peters was named the 60th best place to live by Money magazine, putting it at the top in the state of Missouri. It also ranked in Money magazine's Top 100 in 2010, 2012 and 2017.

The "Rec-Plex" in St. Peters recreation and fitness complex underwent an $18.5 million expansion in 2007. The city also hosts the county's largest shopping center, Mid Rivers Mall.

History
Prior to the arrival of Europeans, the area that would become St. Peters was inhabited by Mississippian mound builders. The remains of a village were uncovered during the construction of I-70 in 1954 and a street near the site was later named Mound Drive after the mounds built by the villagers.

One of the first documented sources about European settlers in the area is a Spanish census from 1791, which documented a land grant.

St. Peters was named for a Jesuit mission established there.

In 1895, music was a binding factor for the area, with a well-known cornet band.

Throughout most of the twentieth century, St. Peters was a small farming town. As recently as 1970, St. Peters had a population of only 486. The population rapidly increased to 15,700 by 1980 and within the span of a decade the community changed from a small rural town to a more suburban community. The city continued its rapid growth through the 1980s and by 1990 had a population of 40,660. St. Peters population increased to an estimated 52,575 as of 2010. St.Peters celebrated its 50th year as a city in 2009, and marked its 100th year as a town in 2010, having become a town in 1910 and a city in 1959.

During flooding in the region, the National Weather Service reported  of rainfall in St. Peters for July 26, 2022, considered an unofficial record.

Geography
St. Peters is located at  (38.778893, -90.603131).

Demographics

2010 census
As of the census of 2010, there were 52,575 people, 20,861 households, and 14,244 families residing in the city. The racial makeup of the city was 91.7% White, 3.7% African American, 0.2% Native American, 1.8% Asian, 0.1% Pacific Islander, 0.8% from other races, and 1.8% from two or more races. Hispanic or Latino of any race were 2.5% of the population.

There were 20,861 households, of which 33.0% had children under the age of 18 living with them, 53.8% were married couples living together, 10.0% had a female householder with no husband present, 4.5% had a male householder with no wife present, and 31.7% were non-families. 26.3% of all households were made up of individuals, and 9.5% had someone living alone who was 65 years of age or older. The average household size was 2.51 and the average family size was 3.05.

The median age in the city was 38.8 years. 23.2% of residents were under the age of 18; 8.3% were between the ages of 18 and 24; 26.9% were from 25 to 44; 30% were from 45 to 64; and 11.4% were 65 years of age or older. The gender makeup of the city was 48.2% male and 51.8% female.

2000 census
As of the census of 2000, there were 51,381 people, 18,435 households, and 13,936 families residing in the city. The racial makeup of the city was 94.25% White, 2.80% African American, 0.20% Native American, 1.23% Asian, 0.01% Pacific Islander, 0.44% from other races, and 1.07% from two or more races. Hispanic or Latino of any race were 1.49% of the population.

There were 18,435 households, out of which 42.3% had children under the age of 18 living with them, 62.8% were married couples living together, 9.7% had a female householder with no husband present, and 24.4% were non-families. 20.3% of all households were made up of individuals, and 6.4% had someone living alone who was 65 years of age or older. The average household size was 2.78 and the average family size was 3.24.

In the city the population was spread out, with 30.0% under the age of 18, 7.4% from 18 to 24, 33.5% from 25 to 44, 21.3% from 45 to 64, and 7.8% who were 65 years of age or older. The median age was 34 years. For every 100 females, there were 95.0 males. For every 100 females age 18 and over, there were 90.6 males.

The median income for a household in the city was $57,898, and the median income for a family was $65,123. Males had a median income of $45,497 versus $30,295 for females. The per capita income for the city was $22,792. About 1.5% of families and 2.7% of the population were below the poverty line, including 2.6% of those under age 18 and 5.1% of those age 65 or over.

Government

Citizens elect a mayor and eight aldermen (two for each of four wards) to govern the city. The Mayor and Board of Aldermen appoint individuals to the positions of City Collector, City Clerk, and City Treasurer. A Municipal Judge of the 11th Judicial Circuit, also known as the St. Peters Municipal Court, has a four-year term. A City Administrator also works for the Mayor and Board of Aldermen.

The Board of Aldermen meets on the second and fourth Thursdays of each month, except the months of June, July, November and December when one meeting is held each month on a date scheduled with the Mayor.

City elections are held in April, per Missouri law for elected officials. Propositions may be voted upon at these elections, or others held in February, August or November.

Mayor – Len Pagano

Aldermen

Ward 1 – Joyce Townsend and Rocky Reitmeyer

Ward 2 – Judy Bateman and Gregg Sartorius

Ward 3 – Terri Violet and Melissa Reimer

Ward 4 – Nick Trupiano and Patrick Barclay

Education
Three public high schools are within St. Peters city limits: Fort Zumwalt South High School with an enrollment of 1,700 students, Francis Howell North High School (2,100 students), and Fort Zumwalt East High School (1,100 students) which opened in 2007.  Some high school students from St. Peters attend schools in surrounding communities such as Francis Howell Central High School in neighboring Cottleville, and Fort Zumwalt North and Fort Zumwalt West High Schools in O'Fallon.  Other public schools in the city include Fairmount, Hawthorn, Lewis & Clark, Mid Rivers, Progress South, St. Peters, and Warren Elementary Schools, as well as DuBray and Fort Zumwalt South Middle Schools. The city limits also contain the private Lutheran High School of St Charles County.

Civic facilities
The St. Peters Rec-Plex, a  family recreation and athletic training complex, is situated next to St. Peters City Hall. The Rec-Plex hosted the 2004 Olympic Diving Trials and is recognized as one of the USA's premier diving facilities.

St. Peters is home to Barnes-Jewish St. Peters Hospital, the county's second busiest after St. Joseph Health Center in St. Charles. Barnes-Jewish St. Peters Hospital serves a large portion of St. Charles County, Lincoln County, and Pike County; it is St. Charles County's second largest hospital, with 175 rooms, and a satellite location of the Alvin J. Siteman Cancer Center.

The Spencer Road Branch library, the largest and busiest within the St. Charles City-County Library District, is in St. Peters.

The city's "Recycle City" opened in April 1997 and has the ability to recycle various types of material which is then sold to companies that use recycled goods in products.  In 2007, Recycle City recycled 12,522,767 pounds of material.

Parks and recreation
St. Peters has the most extensive park system in St. Charles County. Outdoor amenities include: recreation trails, playgrounds, picnic shelters and pavilions, athletic fields, fishing ponds, and landscape areas.
 Brookmount Park – A  park with a one-mile pedestrian trail and playground designed for toddlers and small children.
 Brown Road Park – A  park that features three baseball diamonds, a football field, a picnic pavilion, a BMX track, and a playground
 City Centre Park – A  park near City Hall that includes: three baseball diamonds, a soccer/football field, biking and hiking trails, an inclusive playground for children, and a picnic pavilion with barbecue grills. The park also features a grass outdoor amphitheater for music and the performing arts.
 Community Park – A  a new park in St. Peters with soccer fields and baseball diamonds.
 Country Creek Trail – A , park running along Spencer Creek.
 Covenant Park – A  park which includes a ball diamond, basketball court, two tennis courts, a playground, picnic tables, a barbecue grill and multipurpose trails.
 Dardenne Park – A  park in a sheltered wooded corner next to Dardenne Creek, with a new playground, a paved pedestrian trail, and access to an 18-hole municipal golf course.
 Glen Travis Park – A  scenic natural area with wildlife.
 St. Peters Golf & Recreation Center – A  park and golf course that with tennis courts, a 13-acre fishing lake, a swimming pool, and 18 hole golf course.
 370 Lakeside Park – A  park that includes a 140-acre recreational lake with fishing and boating, including a canoe channel, family picnic areas, park pavilions, walking trails surrounding the lake, playgrounds, an RV park, campgrounds for organized groups, a recreational beach, and a dog park. This is St. Peters' newest park, having opened on May 19, 2011.  It hosts a Celebrate St. Peters festival in mid-September.
 Laurel Park – A  park with a playground, two ball diamonds, two soccer/football fields, two sand volleyball courts, a basketball court, four horseshoe pits, two picnic pavilions and a multipurpose trail system around the perimeter of the park. Laurel Park is also home to an outdoor swimming pool, two lakes and a roller hockey court.
 Lone Wolff Park – An  quiet rural setting with a small pavilion and a competitive horse arena. The site is located adjacent to Brown Road Park and within walking distance of Old Town and Sports Center Parks.
 Oak Creek – A  park which is the smallest neighborhood park in the St. Peters park system. It provides a playground and several picnic tables in a two-acre setting.
 Old Town Park – An  park and, at more than 100 years old, St. Peters' first. It has two ball diamonds, four horseshoe pits, two pavilions and a playground. Old Town Park is also home to the annual St. Peters Olde Tyme Picnic.
 Rabbit Run Park – A  park that include two ball diamonds, three football or soccer fields, a gazebo, and a pavilion. The park currently only consist of 19 acres while another 90 acres is currently under construction.
 Shady Springs Park – A  park that has three baseball diamonds, a soccer field, a large playground and a full service pavilion. Shady Springs also has a half-mile fitness trail through a wooded area on the north side of the park.
 Spencer Creek Park – A  park that includes a ball diamond, basketball court, football/soccer field, two tennis courts, a playground, pavilion and trail system.
 Sports Center Park – A  park. Amenities include three ball diamonds, two soccer/football fields, a concession stand and a half-mile pedestrian trail that circles the perimeter of the park. This park is also home to the Sports Center Gymnasium, an indoor facility for basketball, volleyball or soccer.
 Trailwoods Park – A  park that provides walking, relaxing, or observing wildlife. A short walking trail goes around a small lake surrounded by mature trees. with ducks, squirrels, fish, and other aquatic life.
 Woodlands Sports Park – A  park that has 5 ball diamonds, eight soccer fields, a playground, two concession stands, and two fishing lakes. A number of large-scale baseball and soccer tournaments over the course of the year make it one of the busiest parks in the City of St. Peters.

Climate

See also
:Category:People from St. Peters, Missouri

References

External links
City of St. Peters
Greater St. Charles County Chamber of Commerce – St. Peters & St. Charles Chambers of Commerce merged in December 2011
 Historic maps of St. Peters in the Sanborn Maps of Missouri Collection at the University of Missouri

 
Cities in Missouri
Cities in St. Charles County, Missouri